Stub Series Terminated Logic (SSTL)  is a group of electrical standards for driving transmission lines commonly used with DRAM based DDR memory IC's and memory modules. SSTL is primarily designed for driving the DDR (double-data-rate) SDRAM modules used in computer memory; however, it is also used in other applications, notably some PCI Express PHYs and other high-speed devices.

Four voltage levels for SSTL are defined:
SSTL_3, 3.3 V, defined in EIA/JESD8-8 1996
SSTL_2, 2.5 V, defined in EIA/JESD8-9B 2002 used in DDR among other things.
SSTL_18, 1.8 V, defined in EIA/JESD8-15A, used in DDR2 among other things.
SSTL_15, 1.5 V, used in DDR3 among other things.

SSTL_3 uses a reference of 0.45 * VDDQ (1.5 V).  SSTL_2 and SSTL_18 reference a voltage that is exactly VDDQ / 2 (1.25 V and 0.9 V respectively).

SSTL_3 and SSTL_2 support two termination classes (50 ohm or 25 ohm load). SSTL_18 only supports one (25 ohm load).

See also
High-Speed Transceiver Logic - HSTL

References

External links 
JEDEC homepage links; require (free) login:
 JEDEC SSTL_2 Standard (JESD8-9B)
 JEDEC SSTL_18 Standard (JESD8-15A)

Computer memory
JEDEC standards